The Boston Collaborative Encyclopedia of Western Theology is a freely accessible encyclopedia composed mainly by graduate students of Boston University's Modern Western Theology seminars. It focuses on Christian theology, mainly from the Western world and is edited by Wesley J. Wildman, a professor at Boston University School of Theology. Several entries were consolidated from the work of multiple students by Derek Michaud.

See also
 Stanford Encyclopedia of Philosophy
 Internet Encyclopedia of Philosophy
 List of online encyclopedias

External links
 Boston Collaborate Encyclopedia of Western Theology

Encyclopedias of philosophy
American online encyclopedias